The Deepest Breath is a 2023 documentary film directed and written by Laura McGann that profiles Italian freediver Alessia Zecchini on her quest to break a world record with the help of safety diver Stephan Keenan.

Release
The film had its world premiere on 22 January 2023 at the 2023 Sundance Film Festival. Prior to its premiere, Netflix acquired its distribution rights. It is set to screen in the Special Premieres section at the Copenhagen International Documentary Film Festival 2023.

Reception

References

External links

2023 documentary films
2020s English-language films
2020s sports films
British sports documentary films
Documentary films about women's sports
English-language Netflix original films
Freediving
Films featuring underwater diving
Films produced by John Battsek
Upcoming Netflix original films
Netflix original documentary films
A24 (company) films